Domiati cheese, also referred to as white cheese  (   ), is a soft white salty cheese made primarily in Egypt, but also in Sudan and other Middle Eastern countries.  Typically made from buffalo milk, cow milk, or a mixture, it can also be made from other milks, such as sheep, goat or camel milk.  It is the most common Egyptian cheese. Unlike feta and other white cheeses, salt is added directly to the milk, before rennet is added.  It is named after the seaport city of Damietta (دمياط).

See also
 List of cheeses

References

Arab cuisine
Egyptian cheeses
Sudanese cuisine
South Sudanese cuisine
Water buffalo's-milk cheeses
Cow's-milk cheeses